Tendong Lho Rumfaat (Prayer of the Tendong Mountain) is a festival of the Lepcha people of north-east India. The festival occurs usually in the month of August. According to Lepcha belief, their ancestors went atop the Tendong Mountain to escape from 40 days and 40 nights of continuous rain. This festival commemorates that happening. The 2017 date was August 8.

References

External links
Darjeeling festivals

Festivals in India
Festivals in Sikkim
Hindu festivals
August observances